Haloflavibacter is a Gram-negative, rod-shaped and aerobic genus of bacteria from the family of Flavobacteriaceae with one known species (Haloflavibacter putidus). Haloflavibacter putidus has been isolated from seawater from Yantai.

References

Flavobacteria
Bacteria genera
Monotypic bacteria genera
Taxa described in 2020